Burkhardt is an unincorporated community in St. Croix County, Wisconsin located between the cities of Hudson, and New Richmond in the town of St. Joseph.

History
It was originally named Bouchea (possibly after Peter Bouchea, one of the first four settlers of Hudson), and was renamed in honor of Christian Burkhardt (1834-1931), owner and operator of the mills there, by Guy Dailey, during Dailey's single term representing the county in the Wisconsin State Assembly.

References

Unincorporated communities in St. Croix County, Wisconsin
Unincorporated communities in Wisconsin